The 1979 Amílcar Cabral Cup, the first edition of the tournament, was held in Bissau, Guinea Bissau.

Group stage

Group A

Group B

Knockout stage

Semi-finals

Third place match

Final

References
RSSSF archives

Amílcar Cabral Cup